The 2006–07 NHL season was the 90th season of operation (89th season of play) of the National Hockey League (NHL). The 2007 Stanley Cup Playoffs began on April 11, 2007, and concluded on June 6, with the Anaheim Ducks defeating the Ottawa Senators to win their first Stanley Cup, becoming the first team from California to do so.

League business
The NHL announced that the regular season salary cap rise after the initial season. The 2006–07 salary cap was increased by $5,000,000 (US) per team to bring the salary cap up to $44,000,000 (US). While the 2006–07 salary floor was increased by $8,000,000 (US) per team to $28,000,000 (US). This is the only year where the NHL salary floor raised faster than the NHL salary cap.

The Mighty Ducks of Anaheim officially shortened their name to the Anaheim Ducks prior to the season, introducing a new logo, uniforms and color scheme. This reflected a clean break from their original owners, The Walt Disney Company, who originally named the team after the movie, The Mighty Ducks upon their formation in 1993.

No NHL player had worn the jersey number 84 until Guillaume Latendresse of the Montreal Canadiens began doing so at the start of this season.

Regular season
The NHL All-Star Game returned after a two-year absence when the Dallas Stars hosted the 55th National Hockey League All-Star Game at the American Airlines Center on January 24, 2007. Dallas hosted the All-Star Game for the first time, and it was the first time the Stars franchise had hosted the game since 1972, when it was hosted by the-then Minnesota North Stars. The West defeated the East by a score of 12–9, with Danny Briere of the Buffalo Sabres being named MVP of the game. Fewer penalties were called than in 2005–06 (an average of 398 per team). This led to fewer goals scored overall (7,082) and more shutouts (150). However, more even-strength goals were scored (4,715) than in 2005–06 (4,579).

This season would have an intense battle between Martin Brodeur and Roberto Luongo for the Vezina Trophy and a piece of NHL history. Both goaltenders were vying to break Bernie Parent's NHL record 47 wins in a single season. On April 3, 2007, Brodeur tied the NHL record for most wins in a single season with 47, set by Parent in 1973–74, in a 2–1 shootout victory against the Ottawa Senators. Two days later, he broke the thirty-three-year-old record with his 48th win in a 3–2 victory over the Philadelphia Flyers, which helped the Devils clinch their seventh Atlantic Division title and the second seed in the Eastern Conference. Luongo finished with a career-high 47 wins, one shy of Brodeur, and consequently finished runner-up in a close race for the Vezina. Luongo and Brodeur are considered, however, to have been given an advantage to Parent with the inauguration of the shootout that season by the NHL, allowing more games to be decided with wins, as opposed to ties. 
The Carolina Hurricanes became the first team since the 1995–96 New Jersey Devils to miss the playoffs after winning the Stanley Cup the previous season.

The inter-conference division play had the Northeast visit the Central, the Central visit the Atlantic, the Atlantic visit the Pacific, the Pacific visit the Southeast, the Southeast visit the Northwest, and the Northwest visits the Northeast.

Final standings
Buffalo Sabres won the Presidents' Trophy and home-ice advantage throughout the playoffs.

For the purpose of conference rankings, division leaders are automatically ranked 1–3. These three, plus the next five teams in the conference standings, earn playoff berths at the end of the season.

Eastern Conference

Western Conference

Tiebreaking procedures
If two or more clubs are tied in points during the regular season, the standing of the clubs is determined in the following order:

 The fewer number of games played (i.e., superior points percentage).
 The greater number of games won.
 The greater number of points earned in games between the tied clubs.
 The greater differential between goals for and against.

Playoffs

Bracket
In each round, the highest remaining seed in each conference is matched against the lowest remaining seed. The higher-seeded team is awarded home ice advantage, which gives them a maximum possible four games on their home ice, with the other team getting a maximum possible three. In the Stanley Cup Finals, home ice is determined based on regular season points. Each best-of-seven series follows a 2–2–1–1–1 format. This means that the higher-seeded team will have Games 1 and 2, plus 5 and 7 if necessary, played on their home ice, while the lower-seeded team will be at home for the other games. The format ensures that the team with home ice advantage will always have home ice for the "extra" game if there are an odd number of games in a series.

Awards

All-Star teams

Player statistics

Scoring leaders

Note: GP = Games played; G = Goals; A = Assists; Pts = Points; +/– = Plus/minus; PIM = Penalty minutes

Source: NHL.

Leading goaltenders
Note: GP = Games played; Min = Minutes played; W = Wins; L = Losses; OT = Overtime/shootout losses; GA = Goals against; SO = Shutouts; Sv% = Save percentage; GAA = Goals against average

Coaches

Eastern Conference
Atlanta Thrashers: Bob Hartley
Boston Bruins: Dave Lewis
Buffalo Sabres: Lindy Ruff
Carolina Hurricanes: Peter Laviolette
Florida Panthers: Jacques Martin
Montreal Canadiens: Guy Carbonneau
New Jersey Devils: Claude Julien and Lou Lamoriello
New York Islanders: Ted Nolan
New York Rangers: Tom Renney
Ottawa Senators: Bryan Murray
Philadelphia Flyers: Ken Hitchcock and John Stevens
Pittsburgh Penguins: Michel Therrien
Tampa Bay Lightning: John Tortorella
Toronto Maple Leafs: Paul Maurice
Washington Capitals: Glen Hanlon

Western Conference
Anaheim Ducks: Randy Carlyle
Calgary Flames: Jim Playfair
Chicago Blackhawks: Denis Savard
Colorado Avalanche: Joel Quenneville
Columbus Blue Jackets: Ken Hitchcock
Dallas Stars: Dave Tippett
Detroit Red Wings: Mike Babcock
Edmonton Oilers: Craig MacTavish
Los Angeles Kings: Marc Crawford
Minnesota Wild: Jacques Lemaire
Nashville Predators: Barry Trotz
Phoenix Coyotes: Wayne Gretzky
San Jose Sharks: Ron Wilson
St. Louis Blues: Andy Murray
Vancouver Canucks: Alain Vigneault

Events and milestones
Several former players had their jersey numbers retired during this season:
 Pittsburgh Penguins retired Mario Lemieux's No. 66 for the second time on October 5.
 St. Louis Blues retired Brett Hull's No. 16 on December 5.
 Detroit Red Wings retired Steve Yzerman's No. 19 on January 2.
 Los Angeles Kings retired Luc Robitaille's No. 20 on January 20.
 Montreal Canadiens retired Serge Savard's No. 18 on November 18 and Ken Dryden's No. 29 on January 29.
 Calgary Flames retired Mike Vernon's No. 30 on February 6.
 Edmonton Oilers retired Mark Messier's No. 11 on February 27.

Numerous players reached major milestones during the season:
 Brendan Shanahan became the 15th player with 600 regular season NHL goals when he scored twice in his debut with the New York Rangers on October 5.
 Jaromir Jagr joined Shanahan in the 600 goal club on November 19, making Jagr and Shanahan the first teammates to reach 600 goals in the same season.  Jagr also passed Jari Kurri's record for points by a European-born player and later became the 12th player to score 1,500 career points. Jagr scored his 30th goal of the season against the Montreal Canadiens on April 5, tying Mike Gartner's record for most consecutive 30-goal seasons at 15.
 Joe Sakic became the third player to score 600 career goals this season on February 15. Sakic also became the 11th player to record 1,500 points.
 Teppo Numminen played in his 1,252nd regular season game on November 13, passing Jari Kurri's record for most games played by a European-trained player.
 Mats Sundin became the first Swedish player to score 500 career goals on October 14.
 Teemu Selänne scored his 500th goal on November 23, becoming only the second Finnish player to reach the mark.
 Peter Bondra became the 37th player to achieve 500 goals on December 22, followed shortly thereafter by Mark Recchi as number 38 on January 26.
 On March 13, Mike Modano became the 39th player to score 500 goals. Four nights later, he passed Joe Mullen for most goals by an American-born player by scoring his 503rd goal.

The NHL's youth movement continued:
 Evgeni Malkin of the Pittsburgh Penguins became first player in 89 years to score a goal in each of his first six games in the NHL.
 Pittsburgh Penguins forward Jordan Staal became the youngest player (18 years, 153 days) in NHL history to record a hat trick on February 10.
 Colorado Avalanche forward Paul Stastny set an NHL rookie record by scoring at least one point in 20 consecutive games, breaking Teemu Selänne's record of 17.
 Nineteen-year-old phenom Sidney Crosby claimed the scoring title with 120 points, becoming the youngest player in NHL history to achieve the feat.
 Crosby scored a goal against the Carolina Hurricanes to pass Wayne Gretzky as the youngest player (19 years, 207 days) in NHL history to reach 200 career points.

Numerous other milestones, events, and happenings occurred as well:
 The New York Rangers and Florida Panthers played a historic preseason game on September 23, 2006, when the Rangers defeated the Panthers 3–2 in the NHL's first game in Puerto Rico.
 On November 9, 2006, the Anaheim Ducks set an NHL open era record by remaining undefeated in regulation for the first 16 games of the season, with 12 wins and four overtime losses. The previous mark was set by the 1984–85 Edmonton Oilers, who had 12 wins and three ties.
 On January 2, 2007, the Edmonton Oilers recorded their 1,000th regular season win in franchise history by defeating the Florida Panthers 4–1 at Rexall Place in Edmonton, Alberta.
 On February 1, 2007, Martin Brodeur passed Patrick Roy for first place on the all-time overtime wins list, with 45 career overtime wins.
 On February 22, 2007, eight games went to overtime, setting a record for most on one day. Four of these games went to a shootout. One of the shootouts, between the Ottawa Senators and Buffalo Sabres, was the culmination of a game that saw a huge fight, the result of a late hit on Sabres co-captain Chris Drury, that resulted in 100 penalty minutes and three game misconduct ejections.
 On March 11, 2007, Chris Simon of the New York Islanders was suspended an NHL-record 25 games (minimum) for striking New York Rangers center Ryan Hollweg in the face with his stick during a March 8 game between the two teams. Simon missed the Islanders' final 15 regular-season contests, their five post-season games, and the first five games of the 2007–08 season.
 On March 31, 2007, Vincent Lecavalier of the Tampa Bay Lightning scored his 51st goal of the season against the Washington Capitals, which would be enough to ensure that he became the first Lightning player to win the Maurice "Rocket" Richard Trophy (most goals scored). Lecavalier finished the season with 52 goals. On the same night, Martin St. Louis crossed the 100-point mark for the season, making him and Lecavalier the only teammates in the 2006–07 season to reach 100 points.
 On April 3, 2007, Dominik Hasek of the Detroit Red Wings made 35 saves and moved into a tie for eighth place with Ed Belfour and Tony Esposito on the career shutouts list with 76, in a 3–0 win over the Columbus Blue Jackets. The shutout was Columbus' 16th of the season, setting a modern-day NHL record for shutouts against.
 On April 5, 2007, goalie Martin Brodeur of the New Jersey Devils recorded his 48th win of the season, setting a new record for most wins in a single season by a goaltender. The previous record of 47 wins was set during the 1973–74 NHL season by Bernie Parent of the Philadelphia Flyers.
 For the first time in NHL history, neither of the previous season's Stanley Cup finalists qualified for the playoffs, as both the Edmonton Oilers and defending champion Carolina Hurricanes failed to qualify. The Hurricanes are also the first Stanley Cup Champion since the 1995–96 New Jersey Devils to miss the playoffs the season after their victory.
 The Colorado Avalanche, with 95 points, broke the record set by the Montreal Canadiens in the 1969–70 season who had 92 points, for having the most points of any team missing the playoffs.
 The Vancouver Canucks broke their franchise record of the longest playoff game on April 11, 2007, winning near the end of the fourth overtime, against the Dallas Stars and marking the sixth-longest game in NHL history.
 On June 2, 2007, the Stanley Cup Finals returned to Ottawa for the first time in over 80 years, since the final match between the original Ottawa Senators and the Boston Bruins on April 13, 1927, was played. As reported by The Canadian Press, 99-year-old Russell Williams is in attendance, who attended the previous Finals game. The Senators won the game, 5–3.

Debuts
The following is a list of players of note who played their first NHL game in 2006–07:

 Loui Eriksson, Dallas Stars
 Jack Johnson, Los Angeles Kings
 Anze Kopitar, Los Angeles Kings
 Evgeni Malkin, Pittsburgh Penguins
 Jordan Staal, Pittsburgh Penguins
 Kris Letang, Pittsburgh Penguins
 Rich Peverley, Nashville Predators
 David Krejci, Boston Bruins
 Drew Stafford, Buffalo Sabres
 Joe Pavelski, San Jose Sharks
 Ryan Callahan, New York Rangers
 Keith Yandle, Phoenix Coyotes
 Alexander Radulov, Nashville Predators

Last games

The following is a list of players of note who played their last NHL game in 2006–07, listed with their team:

 Tony Amonte, Calgary Flames
 Ed Belfour, Florida Panthers
Peter Bondra, Chicago Blackhawks
 Sean Burke, Los Angeles Kings
 Mike Dunham, New York Islanders
 Robert Esche, Philadelphia Flyers 
 Darius Kasparaitis, New York Rangers
 John LeClair, Pittsburgh Penguins 
 Eric Lindros, Dallas Stars
 Scott Mellanby, Atlanta Thrashers
 Joe Nieuwendyk, Florida Panthers
 Mike Ricci, Phoenix Coyotes
 Pierre Turgeon, Colorado Avalanche

See also
 2006 NHL Entry Draft
 2006-07 NHL transactions
 2007 Stanley Cup Playoffs
 55th National Hockey League All-Star Game
 National Hockey League All-Star Game
 2006 in ice hockey
 2007 in ice hockey

References
 
Notes

External links

 NHL.com
 Hockey Database

 
1
1